Natasha Yannick McLean (born 22 December 1994) is a Jamaican cricketer who plays as a wicket-keeper and right-handed batter. In October 2018, she was named in the West Indies squad for the 2018 ICC Women's World Twenty20 tournament in the West Indies. In July 2019, Cricket West Indies awarded her with a central contract for the first time, ahead of the 2019–20 season. She plays domestic cricket for Jamaica and Trinbago Knight Riders.

References

External links

1994 births
Living people
People from Spanish Town
Jamaican women cricketers
Trinbago Knight Riders (WCPL) cricketers
West Indian women cricketers
West Indies women One Day International cricketers
West Indies women Twenty20 International cricketers